The Spanish Athletics Championships is an annual outdoor track and field competition organised by the Royal Spanish Athletics Federation (RFEA), which serves as the Spanish national championship for the sport. It is typically held as a two-day event in the Spanish summer around late June to early August. The venue of the championships is decided on an annual basis. The winners have exclusively been Spanish nationals.

The competition was first held in 1917 as a men's only competition. A separate women's began in 1931 but, following the onset of the Spanish Civil War, this was cancelled after 1935 and it was not until 1963 that women events were added alongside the men's programme.

Men

100 metres
1960: Melanio Asensio
1961: Armando Roca
1962: Melanio Asensio
1963: José Luis Sánchez Paraíso
1964: José Luis Sánchez Paraíso
1965: José Luis Sánchez Paraíso
1966: José Luis Sánchez Paraíso
1967: Ramón Magariños
1968: Ramón Magariños
1969: Ramón Magariños
1970: Juan Carlos Jones
1971: José Luis Sánchez Paraíso
1972: José Luis Sánchez Paraíso
1973: José Luis Sánchez Paraíso
1974: José Luis Sarriá
1975: Josep Carbonell
1976: Javier Martínez
1977: Ángel Ibáñez
1978: José Luis Sarriá
1979: José Luis Sánchez Paraíso
1980: Javier Martínez
1981: Josep Carbonell
1982: Javier Martínez
1983: Juan José Prado
1984: José Javier Arqués
1985: José Javier Arqués
1986: José Javier Arqués
1987: José Javier Arqués
1988: José Javier Arqués
1989: José Javier Arqués
1990: Enrique Talavera
1991: Enrique Talavera
1992: Sergio López
1993: Enrique Talavera
1994: Pedro Pablo Nolet
1995: Francisco Javier Navarro
1996: Venancio José
1997: Frutos Feo
1998: Frutos Feo
1999: Pedro Pablo Nolet
2000: Venancio José
2001: Diego Moisés Santos
2002: Orkatz Beitia
2003: Orkatz Beitia
2004: Iván Mocholi
2005: Orkatz Beitia
2006: Ángel David Rodríguez

200 metres
1960: Melanio Asensio
1961: Armando Roca
1962: José Luis Sánchez Paraíso
1963: Francisco Suárez
1964: José Luis Sánchez Paraíso
1965: José Luis Sánchez Paraíso
1966: José Luis Sánchez Paraíso
1967: Miguel Iraundegui
1968: Ramón Magariños
1969: Ramón Magariños
1970: José Luis Sarriá
1971: José Luis Sarriá
1972: José Luis Sarriá
1973: José Luis Sarriá
1974: José Luis Sarriá
1975: Miguel Arnau
1976: José Luis Sarriá
1977: José Luis Sarriá
1978: José Luis Sarriá
1979: Ángel Heras
1980: Juan José Prado
1981: Javier Martínez
1982: Ángel Heras
1983: Antonio Sánchez
1984: Antonio Sánchez
1985: Juan José Prado
1986: Antonio Sánchez
1987: Antonio Sánchez
1988: Cayetano Cornet
1989: Miguel Gómez
1990: Luis Rodríguez
1991: Enrique Talavera
1992: Miguel Gómez
1993: Jordi Mayoral
1994: Frutos Feo
1995: Jordi Mayoral
1996: Jordi Mayoral
1997: Jordi Mayoral
1998: Francisco Javier Navarro
1999: Jordi Mayoral
2000: Jordi Mayoral
2001: Adrián Fernández
2002: Julián Martínez
2003: Jordi Mayoral
2004: Ángel David Rodríguez
2005: David Canal
2006: Josué Mena

400 metres
1960: Virgilio González Barbeitos
1961: Virgilio González Barbeitos
1962: Ramón Pérez
1963: Pablo Cano
1964: Pedro Arteaga
1965: Rogelio Rivas
1966: Ramón Magariños
1967: Rogelio Rivas
1968: Manuel Gayoso
1969: Manuel Gayoso
1970: Rogelio Rivas
1971: Alfonso Gabernet
1972: Alfonso Gabernet
1973: Héctor Hermida
1974: José López Perís
1975: José López Perís
1976: José López Perís
1977: Jenaro Iritia
1978: Jenaro Iritia
1979: Isidoro Hornillos
1980: Benjamín González
1981: Benjamín González
1982: Benjamín González
1983: Ángel Heras
1984: Juan José Prado
1985: Ángel Heras
1986: Ángel Heras
1987: Ángel Heras
1988: Ángel Heras
1989: Cayetano Cornet
1990: José Luis Palacios
1991: Cayetano Cornet
1992: Cayetano Cornet
1993: Cayetano Cornet
1994: Cayetano Cornet
1995: Pablo Escrivá
1996: Antonio Andrés
1997: Antonio Andrés
1998: David Canal
1999: David Canal
2000: David Canal
2001: David Canal
2002: David Canal
2003: David Canal
2004: David Testa
2005: Antonio Manuel Reina
2006: David Testa

800 metres
1960: Tomás Barris
1961: Tomás Barris
1962: Tomás Barris
1963: Tomás Barris
1964: Alberto Estebán
1965: Alberto Estebán
1966: Alberto Estebán
1967: Virgilio González Barbeitos
1968: Enrique Bondía
1969: Teodoro Barrio
1970: Juan Borraz
1971: Francisco Morera
1972: Antonio Fernández Ortiz
1973: Isidro Solórzano
1974: Antonio Fernández Ortiz
1975: Andreu Ballbé Garcia
1976: Andreu Ballbé Garcia
1977: Andreu Ballbé Garcia
1978: Antonio Páez
1979: Colomán Trabado
1980: Colomán Trabado
1981: Colomán Trabado
1982: Colomán Trabado
1983: Andrés Vera
1984: Colomán Trabado
1985: Colomán Trabado
1986: Colomán Trabado
1987: Colomán Trabado
1988: Colomán Trabado
1989: Tomás de Teresa
1990: Luis Javier González
1991: Luis Javier González
1992: Luis Javier González
1993: Luis Javier González
1994: Tomás de Teresa
1995: Tomás de Teresa
1996: Alejandro Miguel
1997: José Manuel Cerezo
1998: Roberto Parra
1999: Eugenio Barrios
2000: Roberto Parra
2001: Antonio Manuel Reina
2002: Antonio Manuel Reina
2003: Antonio Manuel Reina
2004: Antonio Manuel Reina
2005: Antonio Manuel Reina
2006: Juan de Dios Jurado

1500 metres
1960: Julio Gómez
1961: Tomás Barris
1962: Tomás Barris
1963: Tomás Barris
1964: Tomás Barris
1965: Fernando Aguilar
1966: José María Morera
1967: José María Morera
1968: José María Alonso
1969: José María Morera
1970: Antonio Burgos
1971: Antonio Burgos
1972: Rafael García
1973: Francisco Morera
1974: Antonio Burgos
1975: Estanislao Durán
1976: José Luis González
1977: Jaime López de Egea
1978: José Manuel Abascal
1979: José Luis González
1980: José Luis González
1981: José Manuel Abascal
1982: José Manuel Abascal
1983: Colomán Trabado
1984: José Manuel Abascal
1985: José Manuel Abascal
1986: José Luis González
1987: Andrés Vera
1988: Santiago Villalonga
1989: Fermín Cacho
1990: Fermín Cacho
1991: Fermín Cacho
1992: Fermín Cacho
1993: Fermín Cacho
1994: Isaac Viciosa
1995: Fermín Cacho
1996: Fermín Cacho
1997: Reyes Estévez
1998: Reyes Estévez
1999: Andrés Manuel Díaz
2000: Juan Carlos Higuero
2001: José Antonio Redolat
2002: Juan Carlos Higuero
2003: Juan Carlos Higuero
2004: Reyes Estévez
2005: Arturo Casado
2006: Juan Carlos Higuero

5000 metres
1960: José Molíns
1961: Manuel Augusto Alonso
1962: Mariano Haro
1963: Fernando Aguilar
1964: Mariano Haro
1965: Mariano Haro
1966: Javier Álvarez
1967: Javier Álvarez
1968: Javier Álvarez
1969: Mariano Haro
1970: Mariano Haro
1971: Ramón Tasende
1972: Javier Álvarez
1973: Javier Álvarez
1974: Fernando Cerrada
1975: Fernando Cerrada
1976: José Luis Ruiz
1977: Fernando Cerrada
1978: Fernando Cerrada
1979: Fernando Cerrada
1980: Antonio Prieto
1981: Antonio Prieto
1982: Antonio Campos
1983: Luis Adsuara
1984: José Manuel Albentosa
1985: José Manuel Albentosa
1986: Pere Arco
1987: Jaime López de Egea
1988: Juan Carlos Paúl
1989: José Luis Carreira
1990: José Luis González
1991: Abel Antón
1992: Abel Antón
1993: Abel Antón
1994: Anacleto Jiménez
1995: Enrique Molina
1996: Anacleto Jiménez
1997: Manuel Pancorbo
1998: Manuel Pancorbo
1999: Isaac Viciosa
2000: Yousef El Nasri
2001: Alberto García
2002: Alberto García
2003: Jesús España
2004: Carles Castillejo
2005: Jesús España
2006: Jesús España

10,000 metres
1960: Carlos Pérez
1961: José Molíns
1962: Mariano Haro
1963: Fernando Aguilar
1964: Mariano Haro
1965: Mariano Haro
1966: Francisco Aritmendi
1967: Fernando Aguilar
1968: Carlos Pérez
1969: Mariano Haro
1970: Mariano Haro
1971: Mariano Haro
1972: Agustín Fernández
1973: Mariano Haro
1974: Mariano Haro
1975: Mariano Haro
1976: Fernando Fernández Gaytán
1977: Fernando Cerrada
1978: Fernando Cerrada
1979: Fernando Cerrada
1980: Antonio Prieto
1981: Fernando Cerrada
1982: Antonio Prieto
1983: Antonio Prieto
1984: Antonio Prieto
1985: Luis Adsuara
1986: Santiago Llorente
1987: José Manuel Albentosa
1988: Juan Rosario
1989: Alejandro Gómez
1990: Carlos de la Torre
1991: Alejandro Gómez
1992: Antonio Prieto
1993: Alejandro Gómez
1994: Abel Antón
1995: Alejandro Gómez
1996: Alejandro Gómez
1997: Julio Rey
1998: Bruno Toledo
1999: Teodoro Cuñado
2000: José Ríos
2001: José Ríos
2002: José Ríos
2003: José Ríos
2004: José Manuel Martínez
2005: José Manuel Martínez
2006: Juan Carlos de la Ossa

Half marathon
1992: Alejandro Gómez
1993: Alberto Juzdado
1994: Francisco Javier Cortés
1995: Fabián Roncero
1996: José Manuel García
1997: Bartolomé Serrano
1998: Francisco Javier Cortés
1999: Javier Caballero
2000: Antoni Peña
2001: Antoni Peña
2002: Ramiro Morán
2003: Alejandro Gómez
2004: Julio Rey
2005: Antoni Peña

30K run
1966: Carlos Pérez
1967: Juan Hidalgo
1968: Carlos Pérez
1969: Carlos Pérez
1970: Juan Hidalgo
1971: Javier Álvarez
1972: Javier Álvarez
1973: Juan Hidalgo
1974: Santiago Manguán
1975: Mariano Haro
1976: Juan Hidalgo
1977: Fernando Fernández Gaytán
1978: Fernando Fernández Gaytán
1979: José Luis Ruiz
1980: Abel Perau
1981: Vicente Polo
1982: Santiago de la Parte
1983: Roberto García
1984: Juan Barón
1985: Santiago de la Parte
1986: Ramiro Matamoros
1987: Honorato Hernández
1988: José Esteban Montiel
1989: Víctor Urrea
1990: Rodrigo Gavela
1991: Antoni Peña

Marathon
The Spanish Marathon Championships was held on a short course in 1960 (40.123 km), 1963 (41.5 km), and 1969 (40.7 km), but the winner remained valid.

1960: Jaime Guixá
1961: Miguel Navarro
1962: Jaime Guixá
1963: Francisco Guardia
1964: Miguel Navarro
1965: Rufino Galán
1966: Carlos Pérez
1967: Carlos Pérez
1968: Carlos Pérez
1969: Carlos Pérez
1970: Carlos Pérez
1971: Juan Hidalgo
1972: Santiago Manguán
1973: Luis Landa
1974: Juan Hidalgo
1975: Agustín Fernández
1976: José Aparacio
1977: Santiago Manguán
1978: Antonio Romero
1979: Eleuterio Antón
1980: Eleuterio Antón
1981: Eleuterio Antón
1982: Santiago de la Parte
1983: Juan Carlos Traspaderne
1984: Eleuterio Antón
1985: Alfonso Abellán
1986: Santiago de la Parte
1987: Vicente Antón
1988: Alfonso Abellán
1989: Emiliano García
1990: Vicente Antón
1991: Jesús de Grado
1992: Rodrigo Gavela
1993: Ricardo Castaño
1994: José Apalanza
1995: Ricardo Castaño
1996: Rodrigo Gavela
1997: Antoni Peña
1998: Juan Antonio Ruiz
1999: José María González
2000: Benito Ojeda
2001: Benito Ojeda
2002: Not held
2003: Not held
2004: Not held
2005: Roger Roca

100K run
1985: Domingo Catalán
1986: Domingo Catalán
1987: Domingo Catalán
1988: Domingo Catalán
1989: Ángel Lage
1990: Domingo Catalán
1991: Miguel Blanco
1992: Domingo Catalán
1993: Manuel Murillo
1994: Manuel Murillo
1995: Manuel Murillo
1996: Manuel Murillo
1997: Jesús Corredor
1998: Juan Rodríguez
1999: Juan Rodríguez
2000: Ramón Álvarez
2001: Jorge Aubeso
2002: Jorge Aubeso
2003: Jorge Aubeso
2004: Jorge Aubeso
2005: Jorge Aubeso

3000 metres steeplechase
1960: Manuel Augusto Alonso
1961: Manuel Augusto Alonso
1962: Manuel Augusto Alonso
1963: José Jesús Fernández
1964: Manuel Augusto Alonso
1965: Javier Álvarez
1966: Javier Álvarez
1967: Mariano Haro
1968: Félix Lluch
1969: Vicente Egido
1970: Antonio Frechilla
1971: Vicente Egido
1972: Julio Gude
1973: Vicente Egido
1974: Antonio Campos
1975: Antonio Campos
1976: Ricardo Ortega
1977: Antonio Campos
1978: Antonio Campos
1979: Antonio Campos
1980: Domingo Ramón
1981: Domingo Ramón
1982: Domingo Ramón
1983: Juan José Torres
1984: Domingo Ramón
1985: Jorge Bello
1986: Francisco Sánchez
1987: Francisco Sánchez
1988: Jon Azkueta
1989: Benito Nogales
1990: Benito Nogales
1991: Benito Nogales
1992: Jon Azkueta
1993: Antonio Peula
1994: Antonio Peula
1995: Pau Bundo
1996: Elisardo de la Torre
1997: Ramiro Morán
1998: Ramiro Morán
1999: Eliseo Martín
2000: Luis Miguel Martín
2001: Antonio David Jiménez
2002: Antonio David Jiménez
2003: Eliseo Martín
2004: Antonio David Jiménez
2005: Antonio David Jiménez
2006: Antonio David Jiménez

110 metres hurdles
1960: Carlos Viladeval
1961: Manuel Ufer
1962: Francisco Campra
1963: Manuel Ufer
1964: Manuel Ufer
1965: Manuel Ufer
1966: Rafael Cano
1967: Rafael Cano
1968: Manuel Ufer
1969: Rafael Cano
1970: Rafael Cano
1971: Gerardo Trianes
1972: Gerardo Trianes
1973: Gerardo Calleja
1974: Juan Lloveras
1975: Juan Lloveras
1976: Juan Lloveras
1977: Juan Lloveras
1978: Javier Moracho
1979: Ángel Horcajada
1980: Javier Moracho
1981: Javier Moracho
1982: Javier Moracho
1983: Javier Moracho
1984: Javier Moracho
1985: Javier Moracho
1986: Carlos Sala
1987: Javier Moracho
1988: Carlos Sala
1989: Carlos Sala
1990: Carlos Sala
1991: Carlos Sala
1992: Carlos Sala
1993: Carlos Sala
1994: Antonio Lanau
1995: Antonio Lanau
1996: Jesús Font
1997: Jesús Font
1998: Francisco Javier López
1999: Francisco Javier López
2000: Francisco Javier López
2001: Felipe Vivancos
2002: Felipe Vivancos
2003: Felipe Vivancos
2004: Felipe Vivancos
2005: Felipe Vivancos
2006: Jackson Quiñónez

400 metres hurdles
1960: Francisco Javier Sáinz
1961: Francisco Javier Sáinz
1962: Francisco Javier Sáinz
1963: José Girbau
1964: Manuel Gayoso
1965: Manuel Gayoso
1966: Manuel Gayoso
1967: Pedro Carda
1968: Manuel Gayoso
1969: Francisco Suárez
1970: Francisco Suárez
1971: Francisco Suárez
1972: Manuel Soriano
1973: Manuel Soriano
1974: Ramón Ávila
1975: Marceliano Ruiz
1976: Ángel Horcajada
1977: José Alonso
1978: José Alonso
1979: José Casabona
1980: José Alonso
1981: Marceliano Ruiz
1982: Marceliano Ruiz
1983: Carlos Azulay
1984: José Alonso
1985: José Alonso
1986: José Alonso
1987: José Alonso
1988: José Alonso
1989: José Alonso
1990: José Alonso
1991: Santiago Fraga
1992: Santiago Fraga
1993: Santiago Fraga
1994: Iñigo Monreal
1995: Javier Pitillas
1996: Iñigo Monreal
1997: Alberto González
1998: Iñigo Monreal
1999: Juan Herrero
2000: Eduardo Iván Rodríguez
2001: Eduardo Iván Rodríguez
2002: Eduardo Iván Rodríguez
2003: Eduardo Iván Rodríguez
2004: Eduardo Iván Rodríguez
2005: Eduardo Iván Rodríguez
2006: Eduardo Iván Rodríguez

High jump
1960: José López Aguado
1961: Juan Ignacio Ariño
1962: Juan Ignacio Ariño
1963: Juan Ignacio Ariño
1964: Luis María Garriga
1965: Luis María Garriga
1966: Rafael Cano
1967: Luis María Garriga
1968: Luis María Garriga
1969: Luis María Garriga
1970: José Martín
1971: Luis María Garriga
1972: Gustavo Marqueta
1973: Martín Perarnau
1974: Martín Perarnau
1975: Francisco Martín
1976: Juan Carrasco
1977: Roberto Cabrejas
1978: Roberto Cabrejas
1979: Francisco Martín
1980: Roberto Cabrejas
1981: Miguel Ángel Moral
1982: Roberto Cabrejas
1983: Miguel Ángel Moral
1984: Roberto Cabrejas
1985: Gustavo Adolfo Becker
1986: Gustavo Adolfo Becker
1987: Arturo Ortiz
1988: Arturo Ortiz
1989: Gustavo Adolfo Becker
1990: Arturo Ortiz
1991: Arturo Ortiz
1992: Arturo Ortiz
1993: Arturo Ortiz
1994: Gustavo Adolfo Becker
1995: Arturo Ortiz
1996: Arturo Ortiz
1997: Arturo Ortiz
1998: Ignacio Pérez
1999: Javier Villalobos
2000: David Antona
2001: Javier Villalobos
2002: Ignacio Pérez
2003: Javier Bermejo
2004: Javier Bermejo
2005: Javier Bermejo
2006: David Antona

Pole vault
1960: Felipe Armengol
1961: Felipe Armengol
1962: Miguel Cosegal
1963: Miguel Cosegal
1964: Miguel Cosegal
1965: Ignacio Sola
1966: Ignacio Sola
1967: Ignacio Sola
1968: Ignacio Sola
1969: Ignacio Sola
1970: Miguel Cosegal
1971: Ignacio Sola
1972: Ignacio Sola
1973: José Hernández
1974: Roger Oriol
1975: Efrén Alonso
1976: Efrén Alonso
1977: Roger Oriol
1978: Efrén Alonso
1979: Roger Oriol
1980: Roger Oriol
1981: Alberto Ruiz
1982: Alberto Ruiz
1983: Alberto Ruiz
1984: Alberto Ruiz
1985: Alberto Ruiz
1986: Alberto Ruiz
1987: Jorge Corella
1988: Alberto Ruiz
1989: Javier García
1990: Javier García
1991: Françesc Mas
1992: Javier García
1993: Daniel Martí
1994: Isaac Molinero
1995: Javier García
1996: José Manuel Arcos
1997: Isaac Molinero
1998: Montxu Miranda
1999: Montxu Miranda
2000: Montxu Miranda
2001: Javier Gazol
2002: Montxu Miranda
2003: Montxu Miranda
2004: Javier Gazol
2005: Javier Gazol
2006: Luis Moro

Long jump
1960: Luis Felipe Areta
1961: José María Isasa
1962: Luis Felipe Areta
1963: Ignacio Martínez de Osaba
1964: Jacinto Segura
1965: Ignacio Martínez de Osaba
1966: Jacinto Segura
1967: Luis Felipe Areta
1968: Jacinto Segura
1969: Rafael Blanquer
1970: Rafael Blanquer
1971: Luis Felipe Areta
1972: Juan Azpeitia
1973: Rafael Blanquer
1974: Rafael Blanquer
1975: Rafael Blanquer
1976: Rafael Blanquer
1977: Rafael Blanquer
1978: Rafael Blanquer
1979: Alberto Solanas
1980: Antonio Corgos
1981: Alberto Solanas
1982: Antonio Corgos
1983: Antonio Corgos
1984: Antonio Corgos
1985: Antonio Corgos
1986: Antonio Corgos
1987: Antonio Corgos
1988: Antonio Corgos
1989: Ángel Hernández
1990: Ángel Hernández
1991: Jesús Oliván
1992: Antonio Corgos
1993: Ángel Hernández
1994: Ángel Hernández
1995: Jesús Oliván
1996: Jesús Oliván
1997: Florentino Galaviz
1998: Yago Lamela
1999: Yago Lamela
2000: Yago Lamela
2001: Antonio Adsuar
2002: Raúl Fernández
2003: Yago Lamela
2004: Alberto Sanz
2005: Joan Lino Martínez
2006: Alberto Sanz

Triple jump
1960: Luis Felipe Areta
1961: Luis Felipe Areta
1962: Luis Felipe Areta
1963: Domingo Cornudella
1964: Luis Felipe Areta
1965: Jesús Verde
1966: Jaime Rubias
1967: Luis Felipe Areta
1968: Luis Felipe Areta
1969: César Suárez de Centí
1970: Luis Felipe Areta
1971: Luis Felipe Areta
1972: Jesús Bartolomé
1973: Ramón Cid
1974: Alberto Santamaría
1975: Ramón Cid
1976: Ramón Cid
1977: Alberto Santamaría
1978: Ramón Cid
1979: Ramón Cid
1980: Ramón Cid
1981: Ramón Cid
1982: Ramón Cid
1983: Juan Ambrosio González
1984: Juan Ambrosio González
1985: Juan Ambrosio González
1986: Alberto Solanas
1987: Alberto Solanas
1988: Santiago Moreno
1989: Mario Quintero
1990: Santiago Moreno
1991: Santiago Moreno
1992: Santiago Moreno
1993: Raúl Chapado
1994: Julio López
1995: Julio López
1996: Raúl Chapado
1997: Raúl Chapado
1998: Raúl Chapado
1999: Raúl Chapado
2000: Raúl Chapado
2001: Raúl Chapado
2002: Raúl Chapado
2003: Raúl Chapado
2004: Eduardo Pérez
2005: Pere Joseph
2006: Eduardo Pérez

Shot put
1960: Alfonso Vidal-Quadras
1961: Antonio Lamua
1962: Alfonso Vidal-Quadras
1963: Alberto Díaz
1964: Alberto Díaz
1965: Alberto Díaz
1966: Alberto Díaz
1967: Miguel Unanue
1968: Miguel Unanue
1969: Antonio Herrería
1970: Antonio Herrería
1971: Antonio Herrería
1972: Antonio Herrería
1973: Manuel Ruiz Parajón
1974: Manuel Ruiz Parajón
1975: Juan Briceño
1976: Juan Briceño
1977: Juan Briceño
1978: Francisco Martín
1979: Martín Vara
1980: Martín Vara
1981: Martín Vara
1982: Martín Vara
1983: Martín Vara
1984: Martín Vara
1985: Martín Vara
1986: Martín Vara
1987: Martín Vara
1988: Matías Jiménez
1989: Matías Jiménez
1990: José Luis Martínez
1991: Víctor Roca
1992: José Luis Martínez
1993: Manuel Martínez Gutiérrez
1994: Manuel Martínez Gutiérrez
1995: Manuel Martínez Gutiérrez
1996: Manuel Martínez Gutiérrez
1997: Manuel Martínez Gutiérrez
1998: Manuel Martínez Gutiérrez
1999: José Luis Martínez
2000: Manuel Martínez Gutiérrez
2001: Manuel Martínez Gutiérrez
2002: Manuel Martínez Gutiérrez
2003: Manuel Martínez Gutiérrez
2004: Manuel Martínez Gutiérrez
2005: Manuel Martínez Gutiérrez
2006: Manuel Martínez Gutiérrez

Discus throw
1960: Miguel de la Quadra-Salcedo
1961: Luis Rodríguez
1962: Antonio Parés
1963: Luis Rodríguez
1964: Alfonso Vidal-Quadras
1965: Luis Rodríguez
1966: Luis Rodríguez
1967: José Banzo
1968: José Banzo
1969: José Banzo
1970: José Banzo
1971: José Banzo
1972: Agustín Loidi
1973: José Banzo
1974: Sinesio Garrachón
1975: Sinesio Garrachón
1976: Sinesio Garrachón
1977: Sinesio Garrachón
1978: Sinesio Garrachón
1979: Sinesio Garrachón
1980: Sinesio Garrachón
1981: Sinesio Garrachón
1982: Sinesio Garrachón
1983: Sinesio Garrachón
1984: Sinesio Garrachón
1985: Sinesio Garrachón
1986: Sinesio Garrachón
1987: David Martínez
1988: David Martínez
1989: David Martínez
1990: David Martínez
1991: David Martínez
1992: David Martínez
1993: José Luis Valencia
1994: David Martínez
1995: David Martínez
1996: David Martínez
1997: José Luis Valencia
1998: José Luis Valencia
1999: José Luis Valencia
2000: David Martínez
2001: Mario Pestano
2002: Mario Pestano
2003: Mario Pestano
2004: Mario Pestano
2005: Mario Pestano
2006: Mario Pestano

Hammer throw
1960: José Luis Falcón
1961: José Luis Falcón
1962: José Luis Falcón
1963: José María Elorriaga
1964: José Otero
1965: José Otero
1966: José Otero
1967: José Luis Martínez
1968: José Luis Martínez
1969: Antonio Fiblá
1970: José Alcántara
1971: José Alcántara
1972: José Alcántara
1973: José Alcántara
1974: Javier Cortezón
1975: Javier Cortezón
1976: José Alcántara
1977: Antonio Fiblá
1978: José Alcántara
1979: Juan Carlos Álvarez
1980: Raúl Jimeno
1981: Raúl Jimeno
1982: Raúl Jimeno
1983: Raúl Jimeno
1984: Raúl Jimeno
1985: Raúl Jimeno
1986: Raúl Jimeno
1987: Francisco Fuentes
1988: Francisco Fuentes
1989: Raúl Jimeno
1990: Antón María Godall
1991: Antón María Godall
1992: Alex Marfull
1993: Francisco Fuentes
1994: Francisco Fuentes
1995: José Manuel Pérez
1996: José Manuel Pérez
1997: José Manuel Pérez
1998: José Manuel Pérez
1999: Moisés Campeny
2000: Moisés Campeny
2001: Moisés Campeny
2002: Moisés Campeny
2003: Moisés Campeny
2004: Moisés Campeny
2005: Moisés Campeny
2006: Moisés Campeny

Javelin throw
1960: Alfonso de Andrés
1961: Alfonso de Andrés
1962: Alfonso de Andrés
1963: Alfonso de Andrés
1964: Alfonso de Andrés
1965: Alfonso de Andrés
1966: Alfonso de Andrés
1967: Alfonso de Andrés
1968: Fernando Tallón
1969: Fernando Tallón
1970: Fernando Tallón
1971: Fernando Tallón
1972: Gonzalo Juliani
1973: Gonzalo Juliani
1974: Fernando Tallón
1975: Fernando Tallón
1976: Gonzalo Juliani
1977: Gonzalo Juliani
1978: Miguel Cánovas
1979: Manuel de Miguel
1980: Miguel Cánovas
1981: Augusto Lao
1982: Augusto Lao
1983: Antonio Lago
1984: Antonio Lago
1985: Juan Rosell
1986: Julián Sotelo
1987: Antonio Lago
1988: Julián Sotelo
1989: Enric Bassols
1990: Julián Sotelo
1991: Julián Sotelo
1992: Julián Sotelo
1993: Raimundo Fernández
1994: Julián Sotelo
1995: Julián Sotelo
1996: Raimundo Fernández
1997: Antonio Estebán
1998: Alejandro García
1999: Gustavo Dacal
2000: Gustavo Dacal
2001: Eduardo Veranes
2002: Gustavo Dacal
2003: Gustavo Dacal
2004: Gustavo Dacal
2005: Gustavo Dacal
2006: Gustavo Dacal

Barra Vasca
This event is unique to the Spanish Championships, based on a traditional Basque sport.
1960: Manuel Clavero
1961: Manuel Clavero
1962: Bonifacio Allende
1963: Manuel Clavero

Decathlon
1960: José Apráiz
1961: Luis Onaindía
1962: José Blanc
1963: Luis Onaindía
1964: Not held
1965: Ignacio Martínez de Osaba
1966: Rafael Cano
1967: Rafael Cano
1968: Francisco Griso
1969: Miguel Cosegal
1970: Rafael Cano
1971: Rafael Cano
1972: Pedro Pablo Fernández
1973: Rafael Cano
1974: Rafael Cano
1975: Rafael Cano
1976: Rafael Cano
1977: Roberto Cabrejas
1978: Jesús Abadía
1979: Jesús Abadía
1980: Jesús Abadía
1981: Carlos Azulay
1982: David Méler
1983: José María Royo
1984: Gerardo Trujillano
1985: Luis Guillén
1986: Miguel Barahona
1987: Javier Aledo
1988: Carlos Azulay
1989: Antonio Peñalver
1990: Álvaro Burrell
1991: Francisco Javier Benet
1992: Xavier Brunet
1993: Xavier Brunet
1994: Antonio Peñalver
1995: Francisco Javier Benet
1996: Francisco Javier Benet
1997: Francisco Javier Benet
1998: Francisco José Caro
1999: Francisco Javier Benet
2000: Marcos Moreno
2001: Oscar González
2002: Francisco José Caro
2003: Oscar González
2004: David Gómez Martínez
2005: Oscar González
2006: Agustín Félix

20 kilometres walk
The event was held on a track in 1981, 1982, 1985, 1986, and 1989.
1960: Jorge Ribas
1961: Pascual Aparici
1962: Not held
1963: Vicente Caminal
1964: Ramón Ribas
1965: Francisco Sanahuja
1966: Manuel Cabrera
1967: Martín Cassayas
1968: Luis Arnau
1969: Víctor Campos
1970: Víctor Campos
1971: Víctor Campos
1972: Víctor Campos
1973: Víctor Campos
1974: José Marín
1975: José Marín
1976: Jorge Llopart
1977: José Marín
1978: Agustín Jorba
1979: José Marín
1980: Manuel Alcalde
1981: José Marín
1982: Francisco Botonero
1983: Francisco Botonero
1984: Manuel Alcalde
1985: José Marín
1986: Daniel Plaza
1987: José Marín
1988: José Marín
1989: Daniel Plaza
1990: Miguel Ángel Prieto
1991: Valentí Massana
1992: Valentí Massana
1993: Valentí Massana
1994: Valentí Massana
1995: Valentí Massana
1996: Daniel Plaza
1997: Valentí Massana
1998: Paquillo Fernández
1999: Paquillo Fernández
2000: Paquillo Fernández
2001: Paquillo Fernández
2002: Paquillo Fernández
2003: Paquillo Fernández
2004: Paquillo Fernández
2005: Juan Manuel Molina
2006: Benjamín Sánchez

50 kilometres walk
1960: Jorge Ribas
1961: Jorge Ribas
1962: Pascual Aparici
1963: Pascual Aparici
1964: Pascual Aparici
1965: Pascual Aparici
1966: Francisco Sanahuja
1967: Francisco Sanahuja
1968: Francisco Sanahuja
1969: Antonio Amorós
1970: Manuel Garcés
1971: Agustín Jorba
1972: Agustín Jorba
1973: Agustín Jorba
1974: José María Villagrasa
1975: Agustín Jorba
1976: Agustín Jorba
1977: Agustín Jorba
1978: Jorge Llopart
1979: Jorge Llopart
1980: José Marín
1981: Jorge Llopart
1982: José Marín
1983: José Marín
1984: José Marín
1985: Jorge Llopart
1986: Jorge Llopart
1987: Manuel Alcalde
1988: José Marín
1989: Jorge Llopart
1990: Jorge Llopart
1991: Jorge Llopart
1992: Jaime Barroso
1993: Valentí Massana
1994: Valentí Massana
1995: Valentí Massana
1996: Valentí Massana
1997: Jesús Ángel García
1998: Santiago Pérez
1999: Daniel Plaza
2000: Jesús Ángel García
2001: Mikel Odriozola
2002: Mikel Odriozola
2003: Mikel Odriozola
2004: José Antonio González
2005: Mikel Odriozola
2006: Mikel Odriozola

Cross country (long course)
1960: Carlos Pérez
1961: Antonio Amorós
1962: Mariano Haro
1963: Mariano Haro
1964: Francisco Aritmendi
1965: Francisco Aritmendi
1966: Fernando Aguilar
1967: Fernando Aguilar
1968: Mariano Haro
1969: Mariano Haro
1970: Juan Hidalgo
1971: Mariano Haro
1972: Mariano Haro
1973: Mariano Haro
1974: Mariano Haro
1975: Mariano Haro
1976: Mariano Haro
1977: Mariano Haro
1978: Fernando Cerrada
1979: Fernando Cerrada
1980: José Luis González
1981: José Luis González
1982: Antonio Prieto
1983: Antonio Prieto
1984: Antonio Prieto
1985: Constantino Esparcia
1986: Vicente Polo
1987: Constantino Esparcia
1988: Constantino Esparcia
1989: Alejandro Gómez
1990: Martín Fiz
1991: Antonio Prieto
1992: Martín Fiz
1993: Francisco Guerra
1994: José Carlos Adán
1995: Alejandro Gómez
1996: José Manuel García
1997: Julio Rey
1998: Julio Rey
1999: Fabián Roncero
2000: Enrique Molina
2001: Fabián Roncero
2002: José Manuel Martínez
2003: Fabián Roncero
2004: Juan Carlos de la Ossa
2005: Juan Carlos de la Ossa
2006: Juan Carlos de la Ossa

Cross country (short course)
2002: Antonio David Jiménez
2003: Yousef El Nasri
2004: Antonio Martínez
2005: Roberto García
2006: José Luis Blanco

Mountain running
2004: Vicente Capitán
2005: Vicente Capitán
2006: Enrique Meneses

Women

100 metres
1963: María Luisa Cosegal
1964: Elena Souto
1965: Emma Albertos
1966: Emma Albertos
1967: María Luisa Orobia
1968: María Luisa Orobia
1969: María Luisa Orobia
1970: Pilar Fanlo
1971: María Margarita Martínez
1972: Lourdes Valdor
1973: Pilar Fanlo
1974: Ela Cifuentes
1975: Yolanda Oroz
1976: Ela Cifuentes
1977: Yolanda Oroz
1978: Loles Vives
1979: Lourdes Valdor
1980: Lourdes Valdor
1981: Mercedes Cano
1982: Teresa Rioné
1983: Teresa Rioné
1984: Teresa Rioné
1985: Blanca Lacambra
1986: Blanca Lacambra
1987: Yolanda Díaz
1988: Sandra Myers
1989: Yolanda Díaz
1990: Cristina Castro Salvador
1991: Cristina Castro Salvador
1992: Cristina Castro Salvador
1993: Patricia Morales
1994: Cristina Castro Salvador
1995: Carme Blay
1996: Cristina Castro Salvador
1997: Carme Blay
1998: Arancha Iglesias
1999: Arancha Iglesias
2000: Carme Blay
2001: Carme Blay
2002: Carme Blay
2003: Carme Blay
2004: Arancha Iglesias
2005: Belén Recio
2006: Belén Recio

200 metres
1963: Ana María Gibert
1964: Elena Souto
1965: Emma Albertos
1966: Emma Albertos
1967: María Luisa Orobia
1968: María Luisa Orobia
1969: María Luisa Orobia
1970: Josefina Salgado
1971: Josefina Salgado
1972: Begoña Lozano
1973: Begoña Lozano
1974: Josefina Salgado
1975: Rosa Colorado
1976: Ela Cifuentes
1977: Rosa Colorado
1978: Ela Cifuentes
1979: Lourdes Valdor
1980: Maria José Martínez
1981: Yolanda Oroz
1982: Teresa Rioné
1983: Lourdes Valdor
1984: Teresa Rioné
1985: Blanca Lacambra
1986: Blanca Lacambra
1987: Blanca Lacambra
1988: Sandra Myers
1989: Sandra Myers
1990: Cristina Castro Salvador
1991: Carmen García Campero
1992: Mónica Casanovas
1993: Bárbara Lovaco
1994: Cristina Pérez
1995: Lorena Orti
1996: Mercedes Martín
1997: Arantxa Reinares
1998: Elena Córcoles
1999: Julia Alba
2000: Arantxa Reinares
2001: Isabel Vert
2002: Arantxa Reinares
2003: Cristina Sanz
2004: Cristina Sanz
2005: Belén Recio
2006: Belén Recio

400 metres
1964: Rosa Sierra
1965: Celestina Gómez
1966: Josefina Salgado
1967: Josefina Salgado
1968: Josefina Salgado
1969: Ángeles Mandado
1970: Josefina Salgado
1971: Josefina Salgado
1972: Rosa Colorado
1973: Josefina Salgado
1974: Rosa Colorado
1975: Rosa Colorado
1976: Rosa Colorado
1977: Montserrat Pujol
1978: Rosa Colorado
1979: Fina María Polo
1980: Rosa Colorado
1981: Carmen Cocolina
1982: Montserrat Pujol
1983: Gregoria Ferrer
1984: Esther Lahoz
1985: Esther Lahoz
1986: Esther Lahoz
1987: Esther Lahoz
1988: Maite Zúñiga
1989: Julia Merino
1990: Sandra Myers
1991: Sandra Myers
1992: Julia Merino
1993: Sandra Myers
1994: Sandra Myers
1995: Sandra Myers
1996: Sandra Myers
1997: Yolanda Reyes
1998: Yolanda Reyes
1999: Lisette Ferri
2000: Norfalia Carabalí
2001: Julia Alba
2002: Julia Alba
2003: Julia Alba
2004: Julia Alba
2005: Julia Alba
2006: Marlén Estévez

800 metres
1964: María Aránzazu Vega
1965: María Aránzazu Vega
1966: Teresa Torres
1967: Josefina Salgado
1968: Coro Fuentes
1969: Coro Fuentes
1970: Coro Fuentes
1971: Belén Azpeitia
1972: Belén Azpeitia
1973: Josefina Salgado
1974: Carmen Valero
1975: Carmen Valero
1976: Carmen Valero
1977: Rosa Ochandiano
1978: Gloria Pallé
1979: Montserrat Pujol
1980: Gloria Pallé
1981: Rosa Ochandiano
1982: Maite Zúñiga
1983: Maite Zúñiga
1984: Rosa Colorado
1985: Rosa Colorado
1986: Rosa Colorado
1987: Rosa Colorado
1988: Rosa Colorado
1989: Montserrat Pujol
1990: Maite Zúñiga
1991: Maite Zúñiga
1992: Maite Zúñiga
1993: Amaia Andrés
1994: Sonia Álvarez
1995: Eva García
1996: Nuria Fernández
1997: Ana Amelia Menéndez
1998: Ana Amelia Menéndez
1999: Nuria Fernández
2000: Mayte Martínez
2001: Mayte Martínez
2002: Mayte Martínez
2003: Marlén Estévez
2004: Mayte Martínez
2005: Mayte Martínez
2006: Mayte Martínez

1500 metres
1969: Consuelo Alonso
1970: Coro Fuentes
1971: Coro Fuentes
1972: Carmen Valero
1973: Carmen Valero
1974: Carmen Valero
1975: Carmen Valero
1976: Carmen Valero
1977: Carmen Valero
1978: Carmen Valero
1979: Mercedes Calleja
1980: Amelia Lorza
1981: Asunción Sinovas
1982: Mercedes Calleja
1983: Amelia Lorza
1984: Mercedes Calleja
1985: Asunción Sinovas
1986: Gloria Pallé
1987: Angelines Rodríguez
1988: Lourdes Miquel
1989: Maite Zúñiga
1990: Montserrat Pujol
1991: Pilar Sisniega
1992: Mayte Montaña
1993: Maite Zúñiga
1994: Maite Zúñiga
1995: Maite Zúñiga
1996: Marta Domínguez
1997: Maite Zúñiga
1998: Maite Zúñiga
1999: Ana Amelia Menéndez
2000: Natalia Rodríguez
2001: Natalia Rodríguez
2002: Natalia Rodríguez
2003: Natalia Rodríguez
2004: Natalia Rodríguez
2005: Natalia Rodríguez
2006: Nuria Fernández

3000 metres
1974: Carmen Valero
1975: Carmen Valero
1976: Carmen Valero
1977: Encarna Escudero
1978: Carmen Valero
1979: Pilar Fernández
1980: Pilar Fernández
1981: Asunción Sinovas
1982: Pilar Fernández
1983: Ana Isabel Alonso
1984: Asunción Sinovas
1985: Amelia Lorza
1986: Asunción Sinovas
1987: Ana Isabel Alonso
1988: Dolores Rizo
1989: Estela Estévez
1990: Estela Estévez
1991: Julia Vaquero
1992: Julia Vaquero
1993: Estela Estévez
1994: Estela Estévez

5000 metres
1982: Pilar Fernández
1983: Pilar Fernández
1984: Ana Isabel Alonso
1985: Amelia Lorza
1986: Carmen Valero
1987: Asunción Sinovas
1988: Angelines Rodríguez
1989: Estela Estévez
1990: Estela Estévez
1991: Estela Estévez
1992: Estela Estévez
1993: Julia Vaquero
1994: Rocío Ríos
1995: Teresa Recio
1996: Julia Vaquero
1997: María Cristina Petite
1998: Marta Domínguez
1999: Marta Domínguez
2000: Marta Domínguez
2001: Marta Domínguez
2002: Marta Domínguez
2003: Marta Domínguez
2004: Amaia Piedra
2005: Yesenia Centeno
2006: Judith Plá

10,000 metres
1984: Amelia Lorza
1985: Ana Isabel Alonso
1986: Mercedes Calleja
1987: María Luisa Irízar
1988: Ana Isabel Alonso
1989: María Luisa Irízar
1990: Carmen Brunet
1991: Ana Isabel Alonso
1992: Rocío Ríos
1993: Rocío Ríos
1994: Ana Isabel Alonso
1995: Carmen Fuentes
1996: Rocío Ríos
1997: Rocío Ríos
1998: Julia Vaquero
1999: Teresa Recio
2000: Teresa Recio
2001: María Luisa Larraga
2002: María Luisa Larraga
2003: Yesenia Centeno
2004: María Luisa Larraga
2005: Teresa Recio
2006: Marta Domínguez

15K run
1990: Angelines Rodríguez
1991: Carmen Brunet

20K run
1982: Joaquina Casas
1983: Joaquina Casas
1984: Joaquina Casas
1985: María Luisa Irízar
1986: Esther Pedrosa
1987: María Luisa Irízar
1988: Marina Prat
1989: Carmen Brunet

Half marathon
1992: Rocío Ríos
1993: María Luisa Muñoz
1994: Rocío Ríos
1995: Rocío Ríos
1996: Teresa Recio
1997: Angelines Rodríguez
1998: María Luisa Larraga
1999: Ana Isabel Alonso
2000: Griselda González
2001: María Abel
2002: Griselda González
2003: Faustina María
2004: Beatriz Ros
2005: Yesenia Centeno

Marathon
The 1984 Women's Spanish Marathon Championship was held on a short course, but the winner remained valid.
1981: Rosa Talavera
1982: Consuelo Alonso
1983: Consuelo Alonso
1984: Consuelo Alonso
1985: Mercedes Calleja
1986: Mercedes Calleja
1987: María Luisa Irízar
1988: María Luisa Irízar
1989: Marina Prat
1990: Marina Prat
1991: María Luisa Irízar
1992: Ana Isabel Alonso
1993: Mónica Pont
1994: Ana Isabel Alonso
1995: María Luisa Irízar
1996: Aurora Pérez
1997: Rocío Ríos
1998: Not held
1999: Not held
2000: María Luisa Muñoz
2001: María Jesús Zorraquín
2002: Not held
2003: Not held
2004: Not held
2005: María José Pueyo

100K run
2001: Patricia González
2002: Laudelina Franco
2003: Laudelina Franco

3000 metres steeplechase
A women's steeplechase was held in 2001 but did not have official championship status.
2001: Tamara Sanfabio
2002: Zulema Fuentes-Pila
2003: Rosa Morató
2004: Rosa Morató
2005: Rosa Morató
2006: Rosa Morató

80 metres hurdles
1963: María Luisa Cosegal
1964: Natividad Astray
1965: Teresa Montaña
1966: María Jesús Sánchez
1967: Ana María Molina
1968: Ana María Molina

100 metres hurdles
1969: María Jesús Sánchez
1970: María Jesús Sánchez
1971: Ana María Molina
1972: María Jesús Sánchez
1973: Maria José Martínez
1974: María José Martínez
1975: María José Martínez
1976: María José Martínez
1977: María José Martínez
1978: María José Martínez
1979: María José Martínez
1980: María José Martínez
1981: María José Martínez
1982: María José Martínez
1983: Isabel Martín
1984: María José Martínez-Patiño
1985: María José Martínez
1986: Ana Isabel Guerra
1987: Ana Barrenechea
1988: María José Mardomingo
1989: Ana Barrenechea
1990: María José Mardomingo
1991: Ana Barrenechea
1992: María José Mardomingo
1993: María José Mardomingo
1994: María José Mardomingo
1995: María José Mardomingo
1996: María José Mardomingo
1997: María José Mardomingo
1998: María José Mardomingo
1999: Nerea Azkárate
2000: Nerea Azkárate
2001: Glory Alozie
2002: Glory Alozie
2003: Aliuska López
2004: Glory Alozie
2005: Glory Alozie
2006: Glory Alozie

400 metres hurdles
1977: María Luisa Zabala
1978: Montserrat Pujol
1979: Rosa Colorado
1980: Rosa Colorado
1981: Montserrat Pujol
1982: Rosa Colorado
1983: Rosa Colorado
1984: Yolanda Dolz
1985: Cristina Pérez
1986: Cristina Pérez
1987: Cristina Pérez
1988: Cristina Pérez
1989: Esther Lahoz
1990: Cristina Pérez
1991: Idoia Granda
1992: Miriam Alonso
1993: Miriam Alonso
1994: Miriam Alonso
1995: Miriam Alonso
1996: Eva Paniagua
1997: Miriam Alonso
1998: Eva Paniagua
1999: Eva Paniagua
2000: Miriam Alonso
2001: Eva Paniagua
2002: Beatriz Montero
2003: Cora Olivero
2004: Cora Olivero
2005: Cora Olivero
2006: Cora Olivero

High jump
1960: Mercedes Morales
1961: Gisela Struchtemeier
1962: Mercedes Morales
1963: Teresa Torres
1964: Teresa María Roca
1965: Sagrario Aguado
1966: Teresa María Roca
1967: Sagrario Aguado
1968: Teresa María Roca
1969: Sagrario Aguado
1970: Sagrario Aguado
1971: Sagrario Aguado
1972: Sagrario Aguado
1973: Isabel Mozún
1974: Isabel Mozún
1975: Isabel Mozún
1976: Isabel Mozún
1977: Isabel Mozún
1978: Isabel Mozún
1979: Isabel Mozún
1980: Isabel Mozún
1981: Isabel Mozún
1982: Covadonga Mateos
1983: Covadonga Mateos
1984: Asunción Morte
1985: Mónica Calvo
1986: Isabel Mozún
1987: María Mar Martínez
1988: Belén Sáenz
1989: Belén Sáenz
1990: Belén Sáenz
1991: María Mar Martínez
1992: Marta Mendía
1993: Carlota Castrejana
1994: Marta Mendía
1995: María Mar Martínez
1996: Marta Mendía
1997: Marta Mendía
1998: Marta Mendía
1999: Marta Mendía
2000: Ruth Beitia
2001: Marta Mendía
2002: Marta Mendía
2003: Ruth Beitia
2004: Cora Olivero
2005: Cora Olivero
2006: Cora Olivero

Pole vault
A women's pole vault was held in 1994 without official championship status.
1994: Silvia Delgado
1995: Dana Cervantes
1996: Naiara Larrea
1997: Esther Auyanet
1998: María Mar Sánchez
1999: Dana Cervantes
2000: María Mar Sánchez
2001: María Mar Sánchez
2002: Dana Cervantes
2003: Naroa Agirre
2004: Dana Cervantes
2005: María Mar Sánchez
2006: Naroa Agirre

Long jump
1963: Ana María Gibert
1964: Ana María Gibert
1965: Blanca Miret
1966: Rosa María García Ordoqui
1967: María Luisa García Pena
1968: Cristina Alonso
1969: Rosa María García Ordoqui
1970: Rosa María García Ordoqui
1971: Isabel Montaña
1972: Isabel Montaña
1973: Carolina Nolten
1974: Josefina Salgado
1975: Lourdes Unanue
1976: Ángeles Moinelo
1977: María José Martínez
1978: María José Martínez
1979: María José Martínez
1980: Olga Dalmau
1981: Olga Dalmau
1982: Olga Dalmau
1983: Estrella Roldán
1984: Olga Dalmau
1985: María José Martínez
1986: María Jesús Fernández
1987: Estrella Roldán
1988: Isabel López
1989: Sandra Myers
1990: Gregoria Miranda
1991: Isabel López
1992: María Jesús Martín
1993: Luisa López
1994: Yolanda Rodríguez
1995: Dayana Etchenique
1996: Ana María Castiñeira
1997: Vanessa Peñalver
1998: Yolanda Rodríguez
1999: Niurka Montalvo
2000: Niurka Montalvo
2001: Niurka Montalvo
2002: Niurka Montalvo
2003: Concepción Montaner
2004: Concepción Montaner
2005: Niurka Montalvo
2006: Concepción Montaner

Triple jump
1990: Concepción Paredes
1991: Concepción Paredes
1992: Concepción Paredes
1993: Concepción Paredes
1994: Concepción Paredes
1995: Concepción Paredes
1996: Concepción Paredes
1997: Concepción Paredes
1998: Concepción Paredes
1999: Niurka Montalvo
2000: Carlota Castrejana
2001: Carlota Castrejana
2002: Carlota Castrejana
2003: Carlota Castrejana
2004: Carlota Castrejana
2005: Carlota Castrejana
2006: Carlota Castrejana

Shot put
1964: María Luisa García Pena
1965: María Luisa García Pena
1966: María Luisa García Pena
1967: María Luisa García Pena
1968: Concepción Laso
1969: Ana María Molina
1970: María Guembe
1971: Ana María Molina
1972: María Guembe
1973: Ana María Molina
1974: Ana María Molina
1975: Ana María Molina
1976: Ana María Molina
1977: Ana María Molina
1978: Ana María Molina
1979: Encarnación Gambús
1980: Encarnación Gambús
1981: Encarnación Gambús
1982: Enriqueta Díaz
1983: Cristina Carballo
1984: Enriqueta Díaz
1985: Enriqueta Díaz
1986: Margarita Ramos
1987: Margarita Ramos
1988: Margarita Ramos
1989: Margarita Ramos
1990: Margarita Ramos
1991: Margarita Ramos
1992: Margarita Ramos
1993: Margarita Ramos
1994: Margarita Ramos
1995: Martina de la Puente
1996: Margarita Ramos
1997: Margarita Ramos
1998: Margarita Ramos
1999: Martina de la Puente
2000: Martina de la Puente
2001: Martina de la Puente
2002: Irache Quintanal
2003: Irache Quintanal
2004: Irache Quintanal
2005: Martina de la Puente
2006: Martina de la Puente

Discus throw
1964: María Luisa García Pena
1965: María Luisa García Pena
1966: María Luisa García Pena
1967: María Luisa García Pena
1968: María José Fernández
1969: María Luisa García Pena
1970: María José Fernández
1971: María José Fernández
1972: María Luisa García Pena
1973: Dulce López
1974: Mercedes Ribelles
1975: Ana María Molina
1976: Ana María Molina
1977: Carmen García
1978: Encarnación Gambús
1979: Encarnación Gambús
1980: Carmen García
1981: Encarnación Gambús
1982: Encarnación Gambús
1983: Encarnación Gambús
1984: Encarnación Gambús
1985: Ángeles Barreiro
1986: Ángeles Barreiro
1987: Ángeles Barreiro
1988: Ángeles Barreiro
1989: Ángeles Barreiro
1990: Ángeles Barreiro
1991: Ángeles Barreiro
1992: Ángeles Barreiro
1993: Sonia Godall
1994: Ángeles Barreiro
1995: Ángeles Barreiro
1996: Ángeles Barreiro
1997: Rita Lora
1998: Carmen Solé
1999: Rita Lora
2000: Alice Matějková
2001: Alice Matějková
2002: Alice Matějková
2003: Alice Matějková
2004: Irache Quintanal
2005: Alice Matějková
2006: Irache Quintanal

Hammer throw
A women's hammer throw was held in 1994 without official championship status.
1994: Sonia Godall
1995: Susana Reguela
1996: Susana Reguela
1997: Susana Reguela
1998: Susana Reguela
1999: Dolores Pedrares
2000: Dolores Pedrares
2001: Dolores Pedrares
2002: Dolores Pedrares
2003: Berta Castells
2004: Berta Castells
2005: Berta Castells
2006: Berta Castells

Javelin throw
1963: María Luisa García Pena
1964: María Luisa García Pena
1965: María Luisa García Pena
1966: María Luisa García Pena
1967: María Luisa García Pena
1968: María José Fernández
1969: María José Fernández
1970: María José Fernández
1971: María José Fernández
1972: María José Fernández
1973: Rosa María Fernández
1974: María José Fernández
1975: María José Fernández
1976: María José Fernández
1977: Natividad Vizcaíno
1978: Natividad Vizcaíno
1979: Natividad Vizcaíno
1980: Natividad Vizcaíno
1981: Natividad Vizcaíno
1982: Natividad Vizcaíno
1983: Aurora Moreno
1984: Aurora Moreno
1985: Aurora Moreno
1986: Natividad Vizcaíno
1987: Natividad Vizcaíno
1988: Natividad Vizcaíno
1989: Natividad Vizcaíno
1990: Marta Sánchez
1991: María José Maíquez
1992: Cristina Larrea
1993: Cristina Larrea
1994: Cristina Larrea
1995: Idoia Mariezkurrena
1996: Idoia Mariezkurrena
1997: Idoia Mariezkurrena
1998: Marta Míguez
1999: Marta Míguez
2000: Marta Míguez
2001: Marta Míguez
2002: Marta Míguez
2003: Mercedes Chilla
2004: Mercedes Chilla
2005: Mercedes Chilla
2006: Mercedes Chilla

Pentathlon
1965: Natividad Astray
1966: Gisela Struchtemeier
1967: Ana María Molina
1968: Ana María Molina
1969: Ana María Molina
1970: Ana María Molina
1971: Ana María Molina
1972: Isabel Montaña
1973: Carolina Nolten
1974: Pilar Fanlo
1975: Rosa Colorado
1976: Carolina Nolten
1977: Rosa Colorado
1978: Montserrat Pujol
1979: Ana Pérez
1980: Ana Pérez

Heptathlon
1981: Ana Pérez
1982: Ana Pérez
1983: Josefa López
1984: Ana Pérez
1985: Ana Pérez
1986: Ana Pérez
1987: Susana Cruz
1988: María Díez
1989: Susana Cruz
1990: Susana Cruz
1991: Susana Cruz
1992: Susana Cruz
1993: Patricia Guevara
1994: Imma Clopés
1995: Isabel Siles
1996: Imma Clopés
1997: Imma Clopés
1998: Imma Clopés
1999: Imma Clopés
2000: Imma Clopés
2001: María Peinado
2002: Imma Clopés
2003: María Peinado
2004: María Peinado
2005: María Peinado
2006: María Peinado

5000 metres walk
1981: Teresa Palacio
1982: Teresa Palacio
1983: Yolanda Fernández
1984: Mari Cruz Díaz
1985: Emilia Cano
1986: Mari Cruz Díaz
1987: María Reyes Sobrino
1988: María Reyes Sobrino
1989: María Reyes Sobrino

10,000 metres walk
The 1990 event was held on roads.
1990: María Reyes Sobrino
1991: María Reyes Sobrino
1992: Olga Sánchez
1993: Encarna Granados
1994: Encarna Granados
1995: Encarna Granados
1996: María Vasco
1997: María Vasco
1998: María Vasco
1999: María Vasco
2000: Encarna Granados
2001: María Vasco
2002: María Vasco
2003: María Vasco
2004: María Vasco
2005: María Vasco
2006: María José Poves

10 kilometres walk
1982: Teresa Palacio
1983: Teresa Palacio
1984: Mari Cruz Díaz
1985: María Reyes Sobrino
1986: Mari Cruz Díaz
1987: Emilia Cano
1988: María Reyes Sobrino
1989: María Reyes Sobrino
1990: María Reyes Sobrino
1991: Emilia Cano
1992: Encarna Granados
1993: María Reyes Sobrino
1994: Encarna Granados
1995: Encarna Granados
1996: María Vasco
1997: Encarna Granados

20 kilometres walk
1998: María Vasco
1999: Teresa Linares
2000: Eva Pérez
2001: María Vasco
2002: María Vasco
2003: María Vasco
2004: María Vasco
2005: María José Poves
2006: Beatriz Pascual

Cross country (long course)
1965: María Aránzazu Vega
1966: María Aránzazu Vega
1967: Coro Fuentes
1968: Coro Fuentes
1969: Belén Azpeitia
1970: Belén Azpeitia
1971: Belén Azpeitia
1972: Belén Azpeitia
1973: Carmen Valero
1974: Carmen Valero
1975: Carmen Valero
1976: Carmen Valero
1977: Carmen Valero
1978: Carmen Valero
1979: Pilar Fernández
1980: Amelia Lorza
1981: Carmen Valero
1982: Mercedes Calleja
1983: Pilar Fernández
1984: Ana Isabel Alonso
1985: Ana Isabel Alonso
1986: Carmen Valero
1987: Ana Isabel Alonso
1988: Ana Isabel Alonso
1989: Ana Isabel Alonso
1990: Ana Isabel Alonso
1991: María Luisa Larraga
1992: Julia Vaquero
1993: Julia Vaquero
1994: Julia Vaquero
1995: Julia Vaquero
1996: Julia Vaquero
1997: Julia Vaquero
1998: Julia Vaquero
1999: Ana Isabel Alonso
2000: María Abel
2001: Jacqueline Martín
2002: María Luisa Larraga
2003: María Abel
2004: Amaia Piedra
2005: Rosa Morató
2006: Marta Domínguez

Cross country (short course)
2002: María Luisa Larraga
2003: Iris Fuentes-Pila
2004: Jacqueline Martín
2005: Jacqueline Martín
2006: Zulema Fuentes-Pila

Mountain running
2004: María Isabel Martínez
2005: Marta Fernández
2006: Marta Fernández

References

Champions 1960–2006
Spanish Championships. GBR Athletics. Retrieved 2021-01-29.

Winners
 List
Spanish Championships
Athletics